The 1989 Brown Bears football team was an American football team that represented Brown University during the 1989 NCAA Division I-AA football season. Brown tied for second-to-last in the Ivy League. 

In their sixth and final season under head coach John Rosenberg, the Bears compiled a 2–8 record and were outscored 264 to 168. J. Burke and D. Clark were the team captains. 

The Bears' 2–5 conference record earned a three-way tie for fifth in the Ivy League standings. They were outscored 156 to 137 by Ivy opponents. 

Brown played its home games at Brown Stadium in Providence, Rhode Island.

Schedule

References

Brown
Brown Bears football seasons
Brown Bears football